Sengiley is a town and the administrative center of Sengileyevsky District in Ulyanovsk Oblast, Russia, located on the right bank of Kuybyshev Reservoir,  south of Ulyanovsk, the administrative center of the oblast. Population:

History
It was founded in 1666 as a defensive military outpost against nomadic raids. Several slobodas later formed around the outpost and in the beginning of the 18th century the slobodas of Stanichnaya, Butyrskaya, and Vybornaya merged into the village of Pokrovskoye, named for a Church of the Intercession. In 1780, it was chartered as the town of Sengiley; named for its position on the river then of the same name (now the Sengileyka, a tributary of the Volga), which comes from Erzya words syang, meaning tributary and lei, meaning river.

In 1925, Sengiley was demoted in status to that of a rural locality, but was granted urban-type settlement status later that year. Town status was granted to it again in 1943.

Culture

There is a local museum.  It has exhibits in various areas including fine arts and local history.

Administrative and municipal status
Within the framework of administrative divisions, Sengiley serves as the administrative center of Sengileyevsky District. As an administrative division, it is, together with the work settlement of Tsemzavod, incorporated within Sengileyevsky District as the town of district significance of Sengiley. As a municipal division, the town of district significance of Sengiley is incorporated within Sengileyevsky Municipal District as Sengileyevskoye Urban Settlement.

References

Notes

Sources

Cities and towns in Ulyanovsk Oblast
Populated places on the Volga
Populated places established in 1666
1666 establishments in Russia
Sengileyevsky Uyezd